Carlos Septién González (18 January 1923 – 1978) was a Mexican football forward who played for Mexico in the 1950 and 1954 FIFA World Cups. He also played for Real Club España and Jaibos Tampico Madero.

Septién played for Mexico at the 1947 North American Football Championship.

His son is former Dallas Cowboys kicker Rafael Septién. In a 1987 article about Rafael, Carlos was mentioned as being deceased, although his exact death date is unknown.

International career

International goals
Scores and results list Mexico's goal tally first.

References

External links
FIFA profile

1923 births
1978 deaths
Mexican footballers
Mexico international footballers
Association football forwards
Atlante F.C. footballers
1950 FIFA World Cup players
1954 FIFA World Cup players
Real Club España footballers
Liga MX players